Deborah Enilo Ajakaiye  was born in 1940 in Plateau State in Northern Nigeria, and is a Nigerian geophysicist.  She is the first female physics professor in Africa and her work in geophysics has played an important role in mining in Nigeria.

Early life and education
Ajakaiye was born in 1940 in the city of Jos, the capital of Plateau State in the northern region of Nigeria.  She was the fifth of sixth children.  Her parents believed in equal education of the sexes and distributed household chores among both the male and female children. In 1962 she graduated from the University of Ibadan with a degree in physics.  She received a master's degree at the University of Birmingham in England, and in 1970 received her Ph.D. in geophysics from Ahmadu Bello University in Nigeria. Originally interested in mathematics, Ajakaiye says she chose to pursue geophysics because she believed it could help her country.

Ajakaiye attended the Second International Conference of Women Engineers and Scientists held in Cambridge in 1967. A picture of her at the conference banquet, alongside fellow Nigerian physicist Ebun Adegbohungbe, was published in The Woman Engineer's report of the conference in July 1967.

Career
Ajakaiye became the first female professor of physics in Africa in 1980. She has taught at Ahmadu Bello University and the University of Jos, serving as the dean of natural sciences at the latter.  Her work with geovisualization has been used to locate both mineral deposits and groundwater in Nigeria.  She has also created a gravity map of Nigeria, working with several of her female students. After retirement she devoted her time to a Nigeria-based charity, CCWA, which she had founded in 1991.

Awards
Ajakaiye has been recognized for both her scientific advancements and her aid to the nation of Nigeria.  The Nigerian Mining and Geosciences Society honored her for her work, making her the first woman to receive the award.  She was also the first black African to be named a fellow of the Geological Society of London.

Books and Publications

 Course Manual and Atlas of Structural Styles on Reflection Profiles from the Niger Delta 
 A Bouguer Gravity Map of Nigeria
 A Gravity Interpretation of the Liruei Younger Granite Ring Complex of Northern Nigeria

External Links

 https://twitter.com/glo_debo?lang=en
 https://www.linkedin.com/in/professor-deborah-e-ajakaiye-phd-mni-2031bb19b/?originalSubdomain=ng
 https://www.wikidata.org/wiki/Q16105317
https://books.google.com.ng/books?hl=en&lr=&id=uPRB-OED1bcC&oi=fnd&pg=PP1&dq=Deborah+Enilo+Ajakaiye&ots=8ZcvV1ezNC&sig=I2zrblpxcBZp6k8HYAk846dY2rg&redir_esc=y#v=onepage&q=Deborah%20Enilo%20Ajakaiye&f=false

See also
 Timeline of women in science

References

Living people
1940 births
Nigerian geophysicists
Nigerian women geologists
Yoruba women scientists
Nigerian women scientists
University of Ibadan alumni
Alumni of the University of Birmingham
Academic staff of Ahmadu Bello University
Yoruba women academics
Nigerian women academics
Academic staff of the University of Ibadan
Academic staff of the University of Jos
Nigerian expatriates in the United Kingdom
Yoruba people